

Events
March – The first National Invitation Tournament (NIT) is played.  On March 16, Temple University defeats the University of Colorado 60–36 in New York City to become the inaugural champions of this annual tournament.

Tournaments

College
Men
 NCAA
National Invitation Tournament: Temple 60,  36
 NAIA
NAIA:  45,  30